The Plainedge Union Free School District is a school district which serves the hamlets of Plainedge and North Massapequa.

Administration 
The current Superintendent is Dr. Edward A. Salina Jr. The school board is currently composed of President Catherine Flanagan, Vice President Raymond Paris and trustees Jennifer Maggio, Dr. Lynnda Nadien, Dr. Joseph Netto, Sonny Spagnuolo and Sisi Townson.

The principals of the elementary schools are Emily O'Brien (Eastplain), Joseph A. Maisano (John H. West), and Jennifer Thearle (Schwarting), with Sara Azizollahoff serving as assistant principal at all elementary schools. The principal of the middle school is Anthony DeRiso and assistant principals Jennifer Wiesman and Vito Mannino. The deans of the middle school are Casey Kornharens and Brian Wipperman. The principal of the high school is Robert Amster and the assistant principals are Jennifer Vitale and Kevin Burgoyne.

History and organization 

The first Plainedge school was housed in a two-room, wood-frame schoolhouse that became known as the "Annex." It served the district until about 1952 when the John H. West elementary school was built. It was then updated and used as the school district's administration office.

On February 19, 1985, the Plainedge School Union's Board of Education was sued by Carl McCall for a refusal to promote her allegedly based on her gender.

The school district is composed of 3 elementary schools, John H. West elementary, Eastplain elementary and Charles E. Schwarting elementary. The middle school is Plainedge Middle School and the high school is Plainedge High School. Former schools include Robert E. Picken elementary, which was sold to the Town of Oyster Bay to serve as a smaller town hall for the southern part of the town; Northedge Elementary (then Kindergarten), which was knocked down to make room for the new Middle School; Baldwin Drive Elementary and Southedge Junior High, which were demolished and the land sold for housing; and Sylvia Packard Middle School, which was shut down after the school, at 40 years of age, was deemed inefficient to serve the continuing needs of the community.

Since Plainedge is not an official town, its students come from parts of Massapequa, North Massapequa, Bethpage, Seaford and Farmingdale.

As a result of school closures caused by the 2019-2020 coronavirus pandemic, the Plainedge school district arranged a community effort to turn on stadium and porch lights between 8:20 and 8:40PM on May 1, 2020, to honor the graduating senior class.

Notable alumni
 Manjul Bhargava, mathematician and recipient of the Fields Medal (2014)
 Edward Byrne, New York City Police officer killed on duty in 1988
 Steve Guttenberg, actor
 Jim Hodder, drummer with Steely Dan
 John Melendez, television writer and radio personality

References

School districts in New York (state)
Education in Nassau County, New York